George Jennings (1810–1882) was an English sanitary engineer and plumber who invented the first public flush toilets.

George Jennings may also refer to:
George Jennings (MP) (1721–1790), British politician
George Jennings (cricketer) (1895–1959), English cricketer
George Jennings (rugby league) (born 1993), Australian rugby league footballer
George Jennings (actor), British actor who played Mr Woods in EastEnders